Dr. Pentti Ilkka Olavi Arajärvi (born 2 June 1948, Helsinki) is a Finnish Doctor of Law, Professor Emeritus and Docent of the University of Helsinki, a former civil service official and a Social Democratic politician from Helsinki. Arajärvi was awarded the honorary title of valiokuntaneuvos ("Committee Counselor") for his work in parliamentary committees. He is the spouse of Tarja Halonen, who was the President of Finland between 2000 and 2012.

Arajärvi was elected to the Helsinki City Council in the 2012 municipal elections.

Personal life
On 26 August 2000, after a relationship of more than fifteen years, Arajärvi married his longtime partner, Tarja Halonen, who was at the time the President of Finland, in a civil ceremony at her official residence, Mäntyniemi. The couple has no children. Arajärvi has an adult son from a previous relationship.

Honours

National honours
 :
 Grand Cross of the Order of the White Rose

Foreign honours 
 :
 Knight Grand Cross of the Order of the Crown
 :
 Grand Cross of the Order of the Cross of Terra Mariana
 Grand Cross of the Order of the White Star
 :
 Grand Cross of the Order of the Falcon 
 :
 Commander Grand Cross of the Order of the Three Stars
 :
 Knight Grand Cross of the Order of Adolphe of Nassau
 :
 Commander Grand Cross of the Royal Order of the Polar Star

References

External links
Pentti Arajärvi in the archived website of The President of the Republic of Finland

1948 births
Living people
Politicians from Helsinki
Social Democratic Party of Finland politicians
Lawyers from Helsinki
Academic staff of the University of Helsinki
First ladies and gentlemen of Finland
Tarja Halonen

Grand Crosses of the Order of the Crown (Belgium)
Knights Grand Cross of the Order of the Falcon
Recipients of the Order of the Cross of Terra Mariana, 1st Class
Recipients of the Order of the White Star, 1st Class